Organ Peak is the northernmost peak of Arrowsmith Peninsula, Graham Land. Mapped in 1960 from surveys by Falkland Islands Dependencies Survey (FIDS). The name, which arose locally in 1956, is descriptive; the fluted appearance of this peak resembles the pipes of an organ.

Loubet Coast
Mountains of Graham Land